Shalal and Dasht-e Gol Rural District ( – Dehestan Shalal va Dasht-e Gol) is a rural district (dehestan) in the Central District of Andika County, Khuzestan Province, Iran. At the 2006 census, its population was 4,454 in 780 families.  The rural district has 53 villages.

References 

Rural Districts of Khuzestan Province
Andika County